East Ledang is a township in Iskandar Puteri, Johor Bahru District, Johor, Malaysia. Developed by UEM Sunrise Berhad (the property development arm of Kazanah Nasional Berhad - an investment holding company of the Government of Malaysia), it has Townhouses, Link Duplexes, Twin Villas and Bungalows. 
Nearby towns include Bukit Indah and Gelang Patah

References

Iskandar Puteri
Townships in Johor
Towns and suburbs in Johor Bahru District